The 7th Military District was an administrative district of the Australian Army. During the Second World War, the 7th Military District covered all of the Northern Territory, with its headquarters at Darwin.

In 1942, the district was converted into Northern Territory Force.

References

1940s in the Northern Territory
Military districts of Australia
1930s in the Northern Territory